Michael Kashak (born June 11, 1993) is a Canadian football defensive lineman. He played college football for the McMaster Marauders in the Canadian Interuniversity Sport (CIS). He played five seasons for the Marauders which culminated in being named to the OUA first-team all-star team in 2015 and 2016. During these five seasons, the Marauders won the Yates Cup in 2012 and 2014. Following the end of the 2015 CIS season, he was invited to the Canadian Football League’s national combine. He was drafted in the sixth round, 51st overall by the Calgary Stampeders in the 2016 CFL draft. Prior to playing football in the CIS, he played for Holy Trinity where he was part of the Metro Bowl championship team in 2010. Beyond sports, Mike is known for his humble leadership, tenacious work ethic, and desire to make an impact in his community. He is a movie fanatic, inspired by films such as Remember the Titans (2000), The Blindside (2009), Forrest Gump (1994), and Friday Night Lights (2004).

References

External links
 Calgary Stampeders bio

1993 births
Living people
Canadian football defensive linemen
McMaster Marauders football players
Players of Canadian football from Ontario
Calgary Stampeders players